is a TV station, established 1 June 1960, affiliated with Nippon News Network (NNN), Nippon Television Network System (NNS) and All-Nippon News Network (ANN) (since 1989) in Fukui, Fukui.  It is broadcast in Fukui Prefecture.

Radio

FBC AM Radio
 Fukui 864 kHz JOPR
 Tsuruga 1557 kHz
 Obama 1557 kHz

FBC FM Radio
 Fukui 94.6 MHz
Tsuruga 93.6 MHz
Obama 94.6 MHz

TV channel

Digital Television 
 Fukui JOPR-DTV 20ch 1 kW

Tandem office 
 Ōno 42ch 10W
 Katsuyama 28ch 3W 
 Tsuruga 28ch 10W　
 Obama 47ch 10W 
 Mihama 28ch 10W
 Kaminaka 35ch 3W
 Mikuni 30ch 3W
 Sabae-kawada 44ch 1W
 Takefu-minami 36ch 1W

Program

References

External links

 The official website of Fukui Broadcasting 

Nippon News Network
All-Nippon News Network
Television stations in Japan
Mass media in Fukui (city)
Television channels and stations established in 1960
Mass media companies established in 1960
Companies based in Fukui Prefecture
1960 establishments in Japan